The 2021 French Open – Men's Singles Qualifying is a series of tennis matches that takes place from 24 May to 28 May 2021 to determine the sixteen qualifiers into the main draw of the 2021 French Open – Men's singles, and, if necessary, the lucky losers.

Seeds

Qualifiers

Lucky losers

Draw

First qualifier

Second qualifier

Third qualifier

Fourth qualifier

Fifth qualifier

Sixth qualifier

Seventh qualifier

Eighth qualifier

Ninth qualifier

Tenth qualifier

Eleventh qualifier

Twelfth qualifier

Thirteenth qualifier

Fourteenth qualifier

Fifteenth qualifier

Sixteenth qualifier

References 
 Qualifying Draw
 2021 French Open – Men's draws and results at the ITF
 Qualifying Draw PDF

Men's Singles Qualifying
French Open - Men's Singles Qualifying
French Open by year – Qualifying